The 1920 Cincinnati Reds season was a season in American baseball. The team finished third in the National League with a record of 82–71, 10½ games behind the Brooklyn Robins.

Off-season 
Following a very successful 1919 season, in which the Reds won the National League pennant and then defeated the Chicago White Sox in the 1919 World Series, the team had a very quiet off-season, with no notable transactions.  After winning 96 games in 1919, expectations were high in Cincinnati that the club would contend for the pennant again in 1920.

Regular season 
Cincinnati started off the season strong, sweeping the Chicago Cubs in a three-game series to begin the season, and after 12 games, the club was in first place with a solid 9-3 record.  The team ran into a bit of trouble throughout the month of May, going 10-12 over a 22-game span to drop their overall record to 19-15, as the Reds were battling the Pittsburgh Pirates, Chicago Cubs and Brooklyn Robins for first place.

The Reds remained in the hunt for the pennant throughout the month of June, and on June 30, the club had a 35-26 record, and a three-game lead over the second place Robins and Cubs.  Throughout the summer and into September, the Reds, Robins and Cubs continued to battle in the pennant race, with Cincinnati holding a 1.5 game lead over Brooklyn after sweeping the St. Louis Cardinals in a double header on Labor Day.  On September 5, the Reds lost starting pitcher Slim Sallee to the New York Giants on waivers.

Cincinnati struggled over their last 25 games of the season, earning a record of 8-17, and fell completely out of the pennant race.  On October 2, the Reds and the Pittsburgh Pirates played in the last tripleheader of the 20th century held at Forbes Field in Pittsburgh, with the Reds winning two of the games.

Overall, Cincinnati finished the season with a record of 82-71, placing in third in the National League, 10.5 games behind the Brooklyn Robins.  This marked the fourth consecutive season the team finished with a winning record.

Outfielder Edd Roush had another excellent season, leading the Reds with a .339 batting average, four home runs, 90 RBI and 36 stolen bases in 149 games.  First baseman Jake Daubert batted .304 with four home runs and 48 RBI in 142 games.  Third baseman Heinie Groh hit .298 with 49 RBI in 145 games, while outfielder Pat Duncan had a solid .295 batting average with two home runs and 83 RBI in 154 games.

On the mound, Jimmy Ring led the pitching staff, as he finished with a 17-16 record with a 3.54 ERA in 42 games played.  Ring led the club with 266.2 innings pitched.  Dutch Ruether had another solid season, earning a record of 16-12 with a team best 2.47 ERA in 265.1 innings pitched over 37 games.  Ruether also led the Reds with 23 complete games and 99 strikeouts.

Despite failing to qualify for the World Series, the Reds set a team record for attendance for the second consecutive season, with 568,107 fans attending games, an increase of over 30,000 fans over the 1919 season.

Season standings

Record vs. opponents

Roster

Player stats

Batting

Starters by position 
Note: Pos = Position; G = Games played; AB = At bats; H = Hits; Avg. = Batting average; HR = Home runs; RBI = Runs batted in

Other batters 
Note: G = Games played; AB = At bats; H = Hits; Avg. = Batting average; HR = Home runs; RBI = Runs batted in

Pitching

Starting pitchers 
Note: G = Games pitched; IP = Innings pitched; W = Wins; L = Losses; ERA = Earned run average; SO = Strikeouts

Other pitchers 
Note: G = Games pitched; IP = Innings pitched; W = Wins; L = Losses; ERA = Earned run average; SO = Strikeouts

Relief pitchers 
Note: G = Games pitched; W = Wins; L = Losses; SV = Saves; ERA = Earned run average; SO = Strikeouts

Notes

References 
1920 Cincinnati Reds season at Baseball Reference
1920 Cincinnati Reds at Baseball Almanac

Cincinnati Reds seasons
Cincinnati Reds season
Cincinnati Reds